One of the officers present during the Combatant Status Review Tribunals convened at the Guantanamo Bay detention camps, in Cuba, was known as the Recorder.

The structure of the Tribunals loosely resembled the Tribunals described in Army Regulation 190-8, with the key difference that AR-190-8 Tribunals used the definition of "combatant" consistent with that in the Geneva Conventions, while the a much broader definition of "enemy combatant" was used at Guantanamo.

As in the AR-190-8 Tribunals a panel of three officers were authorized to make a determination whether or not an individual had been properly classified as a combatant.  
An additional officer was charged with the responsibility of assembling the evidence the three officers would use in making their determination, and with the responsibility to present that information to the three officers.  For the CSR Tribunals that officer was known as the "Recorder", and was always a military lawyer.
The Recorders were Majors, Lieutenant Commanders, Lieutenant Colonels or Commanders.  The Presidents of the CSR Tribunals were always Colonels or Captains.

CSR Tribunals added a fifth officer, the Personal Representative, whose responsibility was to meet with the captive, try to explain the CSR Tribunal process to them, learn their account of themselves, and present their account to the Tribunal if the captive chose not to attend, or proved unable to present their account themselves.

In the AR-190-8 Tribunal only the President was required to be a field grade officer.  As they were conducted all the officers sitting on the CSR Tribunals were field grade officers.

References

Guantanamo Bay captives legal and administrative procedures